The Flying Neutrinos are an American jazz band from New Orleans.

The band consists of Ingrid Lucia (vocals), Dan Levinson (saxophone), Matthew Munisteri (guitar), Todd Londagin (trombone), Jim Greene (double bass), and David Berger (drums). David Pearlman (a.k.a. Poppa Neutrino), father of Ingrid Lucia, and his wife Betsy started the band in the 1980s. Pearlman was in the press for his trip across the Atlantic Ocean in a raft.

Discography
 I'd Rather Be in New Orleans  (1999)
 The Hotel Child (2001)
 Live from New Orleans (2003)
 Dont Stop (2007)

Selected filmography
 Three to Tango (1999)
 Blast from the Past (1999)
 The Opportunists (2000)

References

American jazz ensembles from New Orleans
Fiction Records artists
Swing revival ensembles